Sophronica nigrovittata is a species of beetle in the family Cerambycidae. It was described by Per Olof Christopher Aurivillius in 1928.

References

Sophronica
Beetles described in 1928